(The Hand of Fate), Op. 18, is a Drama mit Musik ("drama with music") by Arnold Schoenberg in four scenes. It was composed between 1910 and 1913. Like Erwartung, composed a year earlier, it was heavily influenced by Otto Weininger's book Sex and Character. Unlike Erwartung, Schoenberg wrote the libretto for Die glückliche Hand himself. The first performance took place at the Vienna Volksoper on 24 October 1924. The underlying message of the piece is the idea that man continues to repeatedly make the same mistakes, and the plot is developed from events in Schoenberg's personal life.

Composition history
The subject of the drama was influenced by personal circumstances in Schoenberg's life. Schoenberg's music was not as well received as it had been in previous years. Also, two years before the composition of the piece, Mathilde, Schoenberg's wife, had an affair with the painter Richard Gerstl and although she returned to Schoenberg this had a lasting effect on their relationship.

Roles
A man: (baritone)
Two mimed characters: one woman and one man
Chorus: six women and six men in Sprechstimme

Synopsis
The drama takes place in one act in which there are four scenes. It lasts about twenty minutes.
The staging of Die glückliche Hand is complex, due to the range of scenic effects that must be combined with the use of coloured lighting.

The drama represents an inescapable cycle of man's plight as it starts and finishes with the male character struggling with the monster on his back. The male character sings about his love for a young woman (mime) but, despite this love, she leaves him for a well-dressed gentleman (mime). He senses that she has left him and eventually, when she returns, he forgives her and his happiness returns. Again the woman retreats. The woman is seen later with the gentleman, and the male soloist implores the woman to stay with him but she escapes and kicks a rock at him. This rock turns into the monster that was originally seen on the man's back. Thus, the drama ends where it began.

Instrumentation
The score calls for: piccolo, three flutes (3rd doubling on 2nd piccolo), three oboes, English horn, D clarinet, three clarinets (in B-flat and A), bass clarinet, three bassoons, contrabassoon, four horns, three trumpets, four trombones, bass tuba, timpani, cymbals, bass drum, snare drum, tamtam, high and low bells, triangle, xylophone, glockenspiel, metal tubes, tambourine, hammer, harp, celesta, and strings. The piece also employs an offstage ensemble consisting of piccolo, E-flat clarinet, horn, trumpet, 3 trombones, triangle and cymbals.

See also
6-Z44, the Schoenberg hexachord

References

1924 operas
German-language operas
Operas
Monodrama
Compositions that use extended techniques
One-act operas
Atonal compositions by Arnold Schoenberg
Operas by Arnold Schoenberg